Lezant is a civil parish and village in east Cornwall, England, United Kingdom. Lezant village is about five miles (8 kilometres) south of Launceston. The population of the parish in the 2001 census was 751, increasing slightly to 765 in the 2011 census.

Geography
The parish of Lezant is in the Launceston registration district. The county border with Devon forms the parish's eastern boundary. It is bounded on the north by South Petherwin and Lawhitton.

Greystone Quarry and Bridge
Greystone Bridge is the site of a large aggregate quarry operated by Bardon Aggregates. The quarry walls are designated as the Greystone Quarry SSSI (Site of Special Scientific Interest), for its geological characteristics.

Churches
Lezant parish church is dedicated to St Briochus and was considerably restored in 1869. There was formerly an ancient chapel at Trecarrel (or Trecarrell) (see below) dedicated to St Mary Magdalene but it no longer exists.

The parish of Lezant lay within the bishop's peculiar manor and deanery of Lawhitton. The high altar of the church was rededicated in 1336; part of the chancel dates from slightly earlier than that. The rest of the spacious building is of the 15th century and there is a fine tower. In medieval times there was a chapel of St Lawrence (mentioned in 1447) and at Landue a chapel of St Bridget. There was an oratory of the Wyse family at Greystone in 1329.

Trecarrel
At Trecarrel is the hall built by Sir Henry Trecarrel (now used as a barn) very early in the 16th century. The carved stones intended to embellish the hall were afterwards used in the building of the Parish Church of St Mary Magdalene at Launceston. The hall is impressive with fine Perpendicular windows and oak wagon roof; the chapel was still in existence in 1925. King Charles I arrived in Cornwall and spent the night at the house of Ambrose Manaton at Trecarrel on 1 August 1644.

Notable people

Peter of Cornwall, a medieval scholar and prior of Holy Trinity, Aldgate, was born near Launceston, Cornwall, the son of Jordan of Trecarrel (died c. 1180).
Matthew Sutcliffe, Dean of Exeter for over 40 years from 1588 was also Rector of Lezant from 1594.
John Woolton (1535?-1594) was Bishop of Exeter, and from 1584 held the rectory of Lezant in plurality.

References

External links

Civil parishes in Cornwall
Villages in Cornwall
Sites of Special Scientific Interest in Cornwall